Ashley Thomas Baker (born 30 October 1996) is a Welsh professional footballer who plays as a defender for The New Saints of the Cymru Premier. He is a Wales Under-21 international.

Club career

Sheffield Wednesday
Born in Bridgend, Baker began his career as a youth player with Cardiff City at under-14 level. He was released by the club in January 2017, signing his first professional contract for Sheffield Wednesday in the same month.

In May 2018, he made his first team debut for the club, starting at right-back as Wednesday beat  Norwich City in the final Football League Championship match of the season.

Newport County
On 13 January 2020, Baker signed for League Two club Newport County on a one-and-a-half year deal for an undisclosed fee. He made his debut for Newport on 18 January 2020, starting in a 2–0 league win against Swindon Town. He scored his first goal for Newport in the 2-1 FA Cup First Round win against Leyton Orient on 7 November 2020. On 4 June 2021 it was announced that he would leave Newport County at the end of the 2020-21 season, following the expiry of his contract.

The New Saints
In July 2021 he joined Cymru Premier club The New Saints.

International career
Having earned one cap for Wales at under-19 level, Baker made his debut for the under-21 side on 7 September 2018, in a 2–1 victory over Liechtenstein.

Career statistics

Honours

The New Saints
Cymru Premier: 2021–22

References

External links

1996 births
Living people
Footballers from Bridgend
Association football defenders
Cardiff City F.C. players
Sheffield Wednesday F.C. players
Newport County A.F.C. players
English Football League players
Wales youth international footballers
Wales under-21 international footballers
Welsh footballers
The New Saints F.C. players